Trang Ý (20 June 1828 – 3 June 1902), born Vũ Thị Hài or Vũ Thị Duyên, was the wife of Tự Đức and adopted-mother of Dục Đức.

She was a daughter of Vũ Xuân Cẩn. She had no child with Tự Đức, and adopted Dục Đức. After Tự Đức's death, she was granted the title Empress Khiêm, and elevated to the position of one of the "Tam Cung" (三宮) together with Từ Dụ and Imperial Dowager Consort Nguyễn Văn Thị Hương.

Tôn Thất Thuyết decided to launch the Cần Vương movement against French colonists. "Tam Cung" fled to Tomb of Tự Đức together with Emperor Hàm Nghi. Thuyết decided to take them to a mountain base at Tân Sở, and then went to China to hide and seek reinforcements. "Tam Cung" refused, and came back to Huế.

She was granted the title Empress Dowager Trang Ý by Đồng Khánh in 1887, and elevated to Grand Empress Dowager Trang Ý by Thành Thái in 1889. She died in 1902, and was given the posthumous name Empress Lệ Thiên.

References

1828 births
1902 deaths
People from Quảng Bình province
Nguyễn dynasty empresses dowager
19th-century Vietnamese women
20th-century Vietnamese women